Mei Siping (1896 – September 14, 1946) was a Kuomintang politician of the Republic of China and associate of Wang Jingwei. He served in various posts in Wang's government in Nanjing, as well as president of Southern University in 1945, and briefly held office as governor of his home province.

Career 
After the downfall of Wang's government, Mei was arrested and executed for collaboration. His daughter personally denounced him prior to his execution.

Personal life 
He was born in Wenzhou, Zhejiang.

References

Bibliography
 
 KWAN Kwok Huen「Mei Siping小伝」『伝記文学』ホームページ（Taiwan、要繁体字フォント）
 
 

1896 births
1946 deaths
Republic of China politicians from Zhejiang
Kuomintang collaborators with Imperial Japan
Members of the Kuomintang
People from Yongjia County
Executed people from Zhejiang
Executed Republic of China people
Executed Chinese collaborators with Imperial Japan
People executed by the Republic of China by firearm
Politicians from Wenzhou
National University of Peking alumni